The Thorn in Mrs. Rose's Side is the debut album by Biff Rose. It was released in 1968 on Bill Cosby's music label Tetragrammaton Records. "Fill Your Heart" was written together with American composer, singer-songwriter, and actor Paul Williams. The two met while working together on a television comedy show. Tiny Tim released "Fill Your Heart" on his album, God Bless Tiny Tim, six months before Biff Rose's own version. It was also released as the B-side of Tiny Tim's 1968 hit, "Tiptoe Through the Tulips".

David Bowie took a liking to “Fill Your Heart”. It was in his live sets by early 1970 and it led off the second side of his 1971 album, Hunky Dory. Bowie also covered "Buzz the Fuzz" in his live set in 1970-71. He also covered the title track of Rose's 1969 album, "Children of Light", during live concerts.

Track listing
All songs written by Biff Rose, except where noted.
"Mama's Boy" – 02:55 
"Angel Tension" - 03:12
"Fill Your Heart" (Biff Rose, Paul Williams) - 03:12 
"Paradise Almost Lost" (music: Biff Rose; lyrics: Joseph Simon Newman) - 05:20  
"Molly" - 04:12
"The Stars" – 01:53 
"It's Happening" – 01:48 
"What's Gnawing at Me" – 03:14 
"Buzz the Fuzz" – 02:52
"Gentle People" – 02:32 
"The Man " – 03:38

Personnel
 Biff Rose - piano, vocals
Arthur G. Wright - arrangements on tracks 1-3, 7-9
Biff Rose - arrangement on track 4 
Kirby Johnson - arrangement on tracks 5, 6, 11
Nick Woods - arrangement on track 10

Production
Producers: Art Podell, Nick Woods
Engineers: Brian Ingoldsby

Charts

Singles

References

External links
 Biffrose.bandcamp.com
 Books.google.se

1968 debut albums
Tetragrammaton Records albums